Route 135 is a  east-west state highway in eastern Massachusetts. The western terminus is at  U.S. Route 20 in Northborough and the eastern terminus is at I-95 and Route 128 in Dedham.

The first  of the Boston Marathon, from Hopkinton to Wellesley, follow Route 135.

Route description

Route 135 begins at US 20 in Northborough. Continuing into Westborough, Route 135 meets Route 30 at a rotary. The highway continues southeast, crossing underneath Interstate 90 and Interstate 495, but interchanging with neither. The route enters Hopkinton, and turns northeast at an intersection with West Main Street, which provides nearby access to I-495. Route 135 crosses Route 85 just to the east, then continues through Ashland and into Framingham. In downtown Framingham, Route 135 crosses Route 126. Route 135 continues into Natick and crosses Route 27 in the center of town. The road continues into Wellesley, passing by the campus of Wellesley College before entering the downtown area. Route 135 and Route 16 meet at a 5-way intersection and have a short concurrency. Route 135 splits off Route 16 at Wellesley Avenue, then turns southeast onto Great Plain Avenue. The highway enters Needham, and splits off Great Plain Avenue towards Dedham. Upon entering Dedham, Route 135 intersects I-95 and Route 128 at exit 32. This is the eastern terminus of Route 135.

History
Route 135 is one of the state's earliest highway routes established circa 1927. The eastern terminus was originally located at Route 128, at what is currently exit 19. Route 135 traveled west and south on Highland Avenue into downtown Needham, then west onto Great Plain Avenue and its current routing. Streets along this route include Great Plain and Wellesley Avenues in Needham, Central Street in Wellesley, East and West Central Streets in Natick, Waverly Street in Framingham, Union and West Union Streets in Ashland, Main Street and Wood Street in Hopkinton, and Hopkinton Road and Milk Street in Westborough. The western terminus was originally located in Westborough at Route 115, which is now Route 9.

In 1931 the route was extended further west along Milk Street and onto South Street in Southborough and Northborough to US 20. 

In 1932 the route was extended east taking over the original routing of Route 128 from Needham to the intersection of Route 3 (now Route 53 and Route 3A) in Quincy. Streets along this part of the route included Dedham Avenue in Needham, West and East Common Street, High Street and Milton Street in Dedham, West Milton Street and Neponset Valley Parkway in Boston, Milton Street,  Canton Avenue and Centre Street in Milton, and Adams and Washington Streets in Quincy. This part of route was truncated in the late 1950s after completion of the Route 128 expressway between Needham and Braintree made Route 135's routing redundant. The route was cut back to downtown Needham, then routed along Dedham Avenue to terminate at Route 128.

Major intersections

References

External links

135
Transportation in Worcester County, Massachusetts
Transportation in Middlesex County, Massachusetts
Transportation in Norfolk County, Massachusetts